The 2009 Chennai Open was a tennis tournament played on outdoor hard courts. It was the 14th edition of the Chennai Open, and part of the ATP World Tour 250 series of the 2009 ATP World Tour. It took place at the SDAT Tennis Stadium in Chennai, Tamil Nadu, India, from 5 through 10 January 2009.

The singles line up was led by Association of Tennis Professionals (ATP) No. 5, Tennis Masters Cup runner-up, Miami Masters, Pörtschach and Warsaw champion Nikolay Davydenko, Rome Masters finalist and Beijing Olympics doubles gold medalist Stanislas Wawrinka, and Costa do Sauípe and Bucharest runner-up, 2004 and 2005 Chennai champion Carlos Moyá.

Review

Day one
Marin Čilić, Simon Greul and Björn Phau were the early winners in the singles event. The no. 3 seed Čilić overcame Alberto Martín from Spain 6–4, 6–4. The German player Greul had a comfortable 6–3, 6–4 victory over Daniel Gimeno Traver while compatriot Phau beat Santiago Ventura 6–2, 7–5. Greul will now play another German, the no. 5 seed Rainer Schüttler, who took three sets to emerge victorious against home-favourite Prakash Amritraj 6–2, 4–6, 6–1. In the other completed matches, seeded player Marcel Granollers (8) reached the second round without too much difficulty, beating Hyung Taik-Lee of South Korea 6–4, 7–5. The only non-Indian wildcard Lukáš Dlouhý recorded a 3–6, 6–2, 6–4 win against Go Soeda from Japan and Israel's top player Dudi Sela overcame Spaniard Rubén Ramírez Hidalgo 4–6, 7–6(3), 6–1.

The men's doubles also started on the first day. The only seeds in action, American Scott Lipsky and David Martin of Sweden progressed to the second round with a 7–6(9), 6–3 victory over home player Rohan Bopanna and Italian Flavio Cipolla. American duo Eric Butorac and Rajeev Ram advanced 6–1, 6–2 against home wildcards Yuki Bhambri and Harsh Mankad. Oliver Marach of Austria and Serbian Janko Tipsarević beat Spaniards Carlos Moyá and Pablo Andújar 3–6, 6–3, [10-4] (champions tiebreak) to set up a match with Lipsky and Martin in round two.

Seeded players out (singles): None
Seeded players out (doubles): None

Day two
In the remaining first round matches, world #5 and top seed, Russian Nikolay Davydenko, eased to a 6–2, 6–3 victory over Austrian Daniel Köllerer in his first match. He was joined by #4 seed Ivo Karlović of Croatia (defeated American Rajeev Ram 6–0, 6–3), #6 Carlos Moyá of Spain (triumphed against Danai Udomchoke 6–3, 7–6(4)), and #7 Janko Tipsarević of Serbia, comfortably advancing with a 6–2, 6–3 victory over Spaniard Pablo Andújar.#2 seed Stanislas Wawrinka of Switzerland wasn't as fortunate, falling to Italian qualifier Flavio Cipolla 6–4, 6–1. The winners were also joined by Uzbek Denis Istomin who will play Čilić following a 6–4, 7–6 triumph against home player Rohan Bopanna; German Andreas Beck who will play Marcel Granollers after thrashing Roko Karanušić 6–0, 6–1 and Czech Ivo Minář, who beat Wayne Odesnik of America 6–0, 6–3 and preceded to face Karlović in round two.

On the doubles side, #3 seeds Rogier Wassen & Lovro Zovko won their first match, beating Alberto Martín & Dudi Sela 6–3, 6–1. They will next face Eric Butorac and Rajeev Ram in the quarter-finals. In an all-Spanish match between Daniel Gimeno Traver / Rubén Ramírez Hidalgo and Marcel Granollers / Santiago Ventura, the latter pair comfortably won 6–4, 6–2.

Seeded players out (singles): [2] Stanislas Wawrinka
Seeded players out (doubles): None

Day three
Because of rain, no matches were played. However, Lukáš Dlouhý advanced when top seed Nikolay Davydenko was forced to withdraw because of a heel inflammation, which will also keep him out of the Australian Open.

Seeded players out (singles): [1] Nikolay Davydenko (withdrew)
Seeded players out (doubles): None

Day four

Seeded players out (singles): [6] Carlos Moyá
Seeded players out (doubles): [3] Rogier Wassen /Lovro Zovko

Day five
Seeded players out (singles): [4] Ivo Karlović, [7] Janko Tipsarević
Seeded players out (doubles): [1] Mahesh Bhupathi /Mark Knowles

Day six
Seeded players out (singles): [8] Marcel Granollers, [5] Rainer Schüttler (withdrew)
Seeded players out (doubles): [4] Scott Lipsky /David Martin

Day seven
Marin Čilić won his 2nd career title by defeating Devvarman in straight sets.

Finals

Singles

 Marin Čilić defeated  Somdev Devvarman, 6–4, 7–6(7–3)
 It was Čilić's first title of the year and 2nd of his career.

Doubles

 Eric Butorac /  Rajeev Ram defeated  Jean-Claude Scherrer /  Stanislas Wawrinka, 6–3, 6–4

References

External links
Official website

 
Chennai Open
2009
2009 in Indian tennis
January 2009 sports events in India